Leh is the joint capital and largest city of Ladakh, a union territory of India. Leh, located in the Leh district, was also the historical capital of the Kingdom of Ladakh. The seat of the kingdom, Leh Palace, the former residence of the royal family of Ladakh, was built in the same style and about the same time as the Potala Palace in Tibet.

History

Leh was for centuries an important stopover on trade routes along the Indus Valley between Tibet, Kashmir, India and China. The main goods carried were salt, grain, pashm or cashmere wool, charas or cannabis resin from the Tarim Basin, indigo, silk yarn and Banaras brocade.

Although there are a few indications that the Chinese knew of a trade route through Ladakh to India as early as the Kushan period (1st to 3rd centuries CE), and certainly by the Tang dynasty, little is actually known of the history of the region before the end of the 10th century, when Tibetan prince Skyid lde nyima gon (or Nyima gon), a grandson of the anti-Buddhist Tibetan king, Langdarma (r. c. 838 to 841), founded the kingdom. He conquered Western Tibet, although his army originally numbered only 300 men. Several towns and castles are said to have been founded by Nyima gon, and he apparently ordered the construction of the primary sculptures at Shey. "In an inscription, he says he had them made for the religious benefit of the Tsanpo (the dynastical name of his father and ancestors), and of all the people of Ngaris (Western Tibet). This shows that already in this generation Langdarma's opposition to Buddhism had disappeared." Shey, 15 km east of modern Leh, was the ancient seat of the Ladakhi kings.

During the reign of Delegs Namgyal (1660–1685), the nawab of Kashmir, then a province in the Mughal Empire, arranged for the Mongol army to temporarily leave Ladakh, though it returned later. As payment for assisting Delegs Namgyal in the Tibet-Ladakh-Mughal War of 1679–1684, the nawab made a number of onerous demands. One of the least was construction of a large Sunni Muslim mosque in Leh, at the upper end of the bazaar in Leh below Leh Palace. The mosque reflects a mixture of Islamic and Tibetan architecture and can accommodate more than 500 people. This was apparently not the first mosque in Leh; there are two smaller ones which are said to be older.

Trade routes have traditionally converged on Leh from all four directions. The modern highway follows the most direct route from the Punjab via Mandi, the Kulu valley, the Rohtang Pass, and Lahaul to the Indus Valley, then downriver to Leh. The route from Srinagar was roughly the same as the road that today crosses the Zoji La (pass) to Kargil, then up the Indus Valley to Leh. From Baltistan there were two difficult routes: the main one ran up the Shyok Valley from the Indus, over a pass and then down the Hanu River to the Indus again below Khalsi (Khalatse). The other ran from Skardu straight up the Indus to Kargil and on to Leh. Both summer and winter routes ran from Leh to Yarkand via the Karakoram Pass and Xaidulla. A couple of possible routes also ran from Leh to Lhasa.

The first recorded royal residence in Ladakh, built at the top of the high Namgyal ('Victory') Peak overlooking the present palace and town, is the now-ruined fort and gon-khang (Temple of the Guardian Divinities) built by King Tashi Namgyal. Tashi Namgyal ruled in the final quarter of the 16th century CE. The Namgyal (also called "Tsemo Gompa" (Red Gompa), or dGon-pa-so-ma (New Monastery), a temple, is the main Buddhist centre in Leh. There are some older walls of fortifications behind it which Francke reported were once known as the "Dard Castle." If it was indeed built by Dards, it must pre-date the establishment of Tibetan rulers in Ladakh over a thousand years ago.
The Sankar Labrang (Bsam dkar bla brang) is a small, two-storeyed building owned by Sankar monastery. Sankar monastery is the seat of Bakula Rinpoche, immediately to the northwest of Leh. The monastery's Labrang building is located in the old town of Leh, in the Manikhang neighbourhood. Manikhang is the area between the main bazaar of Leh and the historic Stalam path that leads up to the royal palace. Four huge stūpas standing at this point mark the beginning of historic Leh. In recent memory, the Sankar Labrang had a metalsmith's workshop downstairs, while upstairs lived the monk caretaker of the White Maitreya Temple (Byams khang dkar po), also known locally as "Street Maitreya". The White Maitreya Temple dates back to the reign of King Drakpa Bumd´e (Grags pa 'bum lde, r. ca 1410–1435), following the arrival of a mission sent to Ladakh by the Tibetan lama Tsongkhapa.
Below this are the Chamba (Byams-pa, i.e., Maitreya) and Chenresi (sPyan-ras-gzigs, i.e. Avalokiteshvara) monasteries which are of uncertain date.

Leh Palace

The royal palace, known as Leh Palace, was built by King Sengge Namgyal (1612–1642), presumably between the period when the Portuguese Jesuit priest Francisco de Azevedo visited Leh in 1631, and made no mention of it, and Sengge Namgyal's death in 1642.

The Leh Palace is nine storeys high; the upper floors accommodated the royal family, and the stables and storerooms are located on the lower floors. The palace was abandoned when Kashmiri forces besieged it in the mid-19th century. The royal family moved their premises south to their current home in Stok Palace on the southern bank of the Indus River.

As has already been mentioned, the original name of the town was not sLel, as it is nowadays spelled, but sLes, which signifies an "encampment of nomads". These [Tibetan] nomads probably visited the Leh valley at when it began to be irrigated by Dard colonisers. The most ancient part of the ruins, atop rNam-rgyal-rtse-mo hill, are called 'aBrog-pal-mkhar (Dard castle).

In 2010, Leh was heavily damaged by the sudden floods caused by a cloud burst.

Administration
The Ladakh Autonomous Hill Development Council (LAHDC) is in charge of governance in Leh.

It has 30 councillors, 4 nominated and 26 elected. The Chief Executive Councillor heads and chairs this council. The Deputy Commissioner of Leh also holds the power of Chief Executive Officer of the LAHDC. The current Deputy Commissioner of Leh district is Sachin Kumar Vaishya.

Leh Old Town

The old town of Leh was added to the World Monuments Fund's list of 100 most endangered sites due to increased rainfall, due to climate change among other reasons. Neglect and changing settlement patterns in the old town have alsothreatened the long-term preservation of the site.

The rapid and poorly planned urbanisation of Leh has increased the risk of flash floods in some areas, while other areas, according to research by the Climate and Development Knowledge Network, suffer from the less dramatic, gradual effects of 'invisible disasters', which often go unreported.

Geography

The city is located on the bank of the Indus River. The mountains dominate the landscape around the Leh, as it is at an altitude of 3,500m. Peaks such as Nanga Sago can reach well above 5,500m. The principal access roads include the 434 km Srinagar-Leh highway and the 428 km Leh-Manali Highway. Both roads are only open on a seasonal basis. Although the roads from Srinagar and Manali are often blocked by snow in winter, the local roads in the Indus Valley usually remain open due to the low levels of snowfall.

Climate
Leh has a cold desert climate (Köppen climate classification BWk) with long, cold winters from late November to early March, with minimum temperatures well below freezing for most of the winter. The city gets occasional snowfall during winter, which is very cold by Indian standards, mainly due to its high elevation. The weather in the remaining months is generally fine and warm during the day. Average annual rainfall is only 35 mm (1.37 inches). In 2010, the city experienced flash floods that killed more than 100 people.

Agriculture

Leh is located at an average elevation of about 3500 metres, which means that only one crop a year can be grown there, while two can be grown at Khalatse. By the time crops are being sown at Leh in late May, they are already half-grown at Khalatse. The main crop is grim (naked barley, Hordeum vulgare L. var. nudum Hook. f., an ancient form of domesticated barley with an easier-to-remove hull. Tsampa, the staple food in Ladakh, is made from this barley. The water for agriculture of Ladakh comes from the Indus, which runs low in March and April when barley-fields have the greatest need for irrigation. Grapes, apricots, currants, walnuts, and apples are also grown in the arid temperate climate.

Demographics

As of the 2011 India census, Leh town had a population of 30,870. Males constituted 70% of the population and females 30%, due to a large presence of non-local labourers, traders and government employees. The child sex ratio is 987. Leh has an average literacy rate of 90%, higher than the national average of 74.04%: male literacy is 94.89%, and female literacy is 78.85%. In Leh, 5.5% of the population is under 6 years of age. The people of Leh are ethnic Tibetans who speak
Ladakhi, a Tibetic language.

The Muslim presence dates back to the annexation of Ladakh by Kashmir, after the Fifth Dalai Lama came to Ladakh from Tibet. Since then, there has been further migration from the Kashmir Valley, due to trade and recently to the transfer of tourism from the Kashmir Valley to Ladakh.

Ladakh receives very large numbers of tourists for its size. In 2010, 77,800 tourists visited Leh. Visitor numbers have swelled rapidly in recent years, increasing 77% from 2005 to 2010. This growth is largely caused by an increase in domestic Indian travellers.

Religion
Buddhism is the largest religion in Leh, followed by over 43.8% of people. Hinduism is the second-largest religion with 35.4% adherents. Islam and Sikhism form 15.14% and 2.7% of the population respectively.

While Hinduism has the second largest number of followers after Buddhism, as many as 95% of them are male, most of them migrant workers.

Since the 8th century, people of different religions, particularly Buddhism and Islam, have lived in Leh. They co-inhabited the region from the early Namgyal dynasty and there are no records of any conflict between them. Meer Izzut-oollah wrote in the early 19th century:

This mosque was built by Ibraheem Khan (in the mid 17th century), who was a man of noble family in the service of the descendants of Timoor. In his time the Kalimaks (Calmuck Tartars), having invaded and obtained possession of the greater portion of Thibet [Ladakh], the Raja of that country claimed protection from the Emperor of Hindoostan. Ibraheem Khan was accordingly deputed by that monarch to his assistance, and in a short time succeeded in expelling the invaders and placing the Raja once more on his throne. The Raja embraced the Mahomedan faith, and formally acknowledged himself as a feudatory of the Emperor, who honored him with the title of Raja Akibut Muhmood Khan, which title to the present day is borne by the Ruler of Cashmere.

In recent times, Muslim migration to Leh from neighbouring Kargil and Kashmir has increased due to better opportunities, and relations between the Buddhist and Muslim communities have soured due to socio-political conflicts.

Other religions such as Christianity, Hinduism and Sikhism do exist in Leh. The small Christian community in Leh descend from Tibetan Buddhists converted by German Moravian missionaries, who established a church at Keylong in Lahaul in the 1860s, and were allowed to open another mission in Leh in 1885 and had a sub-branch in Khalatse. They stayed until Indian Independence in 1947. In spite of their successful medical and educational activities, they made only a few converts.

Every year Sindhu Darshan Festival is held at Shey, 15 km from town, to promote religious harmony and the glory of the Indus (Sindhu) river. Many tourists come to Leh for this.

Attractions

In Leh

Leh Palace
Namgyal Tsemo Gompa
Shanti Stupa
Cho Khang Gompa
Chamba Temple
Jama Masjid
Gurdwara Pathar Sahib
Sankar Gompa and village
War Museum
The Victory Tower
Zorawar Fort
Ladakh Marathon
Datun Sahib
Ice Stupa

Transportation

Road
Leh is connected to the rest of India by two high-altitude roads, both of which are subject to landslides and neither of which is passable in winter due to snows. The National Highway 1 from Srinagar via Kargil is generally open longer. The Leh-Manali Highway can be troublesome due to very high passes and plateaus. A third road is under construction.

National Highway 1
The overland approach to Ladakh from the Kashmir valley via the 434-km. National Highway 1 typically remains open for traffic from April/May to October/November. The most dramatic part of this journey is the ascent up the 3,505 m (11,500 ft.) high Zoji-la, a tortuous pass in the Great Himalayan Wall. The Jammu and Kashmir State Road Transport Corporation (JKSRTC) operates regular deluxe and ordinary bus services between Srinagar and Leh on this route, with an overnight halt at Kargil. Taxis (cars and jeeps) are also available at Srinagar for the journey.

National Highway 3 or Leh-Manali Highway
Since 1989, the 473-km Leh-Manali Highway serves as the second land approach to Ladakh. Open from June to late October, this high road traverses the upland desert plateaux of Rupsho, whose altitude ranges from 3,660 m to 4,570 m. There are a number of high passes en route among which the highest one, known as Tanglang La, is sometimes (but incorrectly) claimed to be the world's second-highest motorable pass at an altitude of 5,325 m. (17,469 feet). Khardung La for a discussion of the world's highest motorable passes

Nimmu–Padam–Darcha road

This third road to Leh is currently under construction.

Air

Leh Kushok Bakula Rimpochee Airport has flights to and fro Delhi, Jammu, Srinagar and Chandigarh. Air India, Go First, IndiGo & Vistara operate Delhi to Leh daily with multiple flights at
peak times.

Rail
There is currently no railway service in Ladakh, however two railway routes are proposed: the Bhanupli–Leh line and Srinagar–Kargil–Leh line.,

Banking facilities
List of functioning banks in Leh
State Bank of India, Leh
HDFC Bank, Leh
Axis Bank, Leh
IDBI Bank, Leh

Media and communications
State-owned All India Radio Leh has a local station in Leh, which transmits various programs of mass interest. Leh head post office owned by India Post also serves as a major means of communications. On 14 December 2021, the first FM radio station in Ladakh was established in Leh.

See also
Sonmarg
Ladakh
Dal Lake
Mughal Road
Gulmarg
Pahalgam
Gangabal
Zanskar
Kargil

Footnotes

References
Alexander, André, and Van Shaik, Sam. (2011). The Stone Maitreya of Leh: The Rediscovery and Recovery of an Early Tibetan Monument.. JRAS, Series 3, 21, 4(2011), pp. 421–439.Janet Rizvi. Ladakh: Crossroads of High Asia. Second Edition. (1996). Oxford University Press, Delhi. .
Cunningham, Alexander. (1854). LADĀK: Physical, Statistical, and Historical with Notices of the Surrounding Countries. London. Reprint: Sagar Publications (1977).
Francke, A. H. (1977). A History of Ladakh. (Originally published as, A History of Western Tibet, (1907)). 1977 Edition with critical introduction and annotations by S. S. Gergan & F. M. Hassnain. Sterling Publishers, New Delhi.
Francke, A. H. (1914). Antiquities of Indian Tibet''. Two Volumes. Calcutta. 1972 reprint: S. Chand, New Delhi.

External links
Visit Ladakh Daily website – Ladakh Leading News Website
Population Figures
City of Leh Thrives as Oasis of Peace in Kashmir

 
Ladakh
Cities and towns in Leh district
Indian union territory capitals
Geography of Ladakh